Jacob Christoph Le Blon, or Jakob Christoffel Le Blon, (2 May 1667 – 16 May 1741) was a painter and engraver from Frankfurt who invented the system of three- and four-colour printing, using an RYB color model which segued into the modern CMYK system. He used the mezzotint method to engrave three or four metal plates (one each per printing ink) to make prints with a wide range of colours. His methods helped form the foundation for modern colour printing.

Biography
On his father's side Le Blon descended from Huguenots fleeing France in 1576, having settled in Frankfurt. His grandfather Christof Le Blon married Susanna Barbara Merian daughter of the artist and engraver Matthäus Merian (1593–1650). Le Blon is reported to have received training as a young man from the Swiss painter and engraver Conrad Ferdinand Meyer (1618–1689) in Zurich but there is no documentary evidence.[1] It is generally agreed that Le Blon had an extended stay sometime between 1696 and 1702 in Rome where he is reported to have studied art under the painter Carlo Maratta (1625–1713). There he became acquainted with the Dutch painter and engraver Bonaventura van Overbeek who created an extensive work of views of the antiquities of Rome, published posthumously in 1708 and containing a portrait of Overbeek attributed to Le Blon.[4] Encouraged by van Overbeek, Le Blon moved to Amsterdam, presumably in 1702, where he worked as a miniature painter and engraver. In 1705 he married Gerarda Vloet with whom he had two sons that appear to have died in infancy.

In 1707 Le Blon issued a short publication in Dutch on the forms of the human body. In 1708 and 1709 he is known to have made colorant mixing experiments in Amsterdam and in 1710 he made his first color prints with yellow, red, and blue plates. While in Amsterdam he became acquainted with Arnold Houbraken, who quoted him as a source of information on German painters for his Schouburg, later published after Houbraken's death in 1718. Le Blon's wife died in 1716 and in 1717 he moved to London where he received royal patents for the three-color printing process and a three-color tapestry weaving process. The tapestry process involved using white, yellow, red, blue, and black fibers to create images. The printing process involved using three different intaglio plates, inked in different colours.

In 1725 he published Coloritto, in French and English. In Coloritto, Le Blon asserted that “the art of mixing colours…(in) painting can represent all visible objects with three colours: yellow, red and blue; for all colours can be composed of these three, which I call Primitive”. Le Blon added that red and yellow make orange; red and blue, make purple/violet; and blue and yellow make green (Le Blon, 1725, p6).

During his stay in England he produced several dozen of three- and four-colored images in multiple copies that initially sold well in England and on the continent. In the long run his enterprise did not succeed, however, and Le Blon left England in 1735, moving to Paris where he continued producing prints by his method. During his last years several sequences of prints were produced and sold showing the different steps of his printing process, such as a portrait of the French Cardinal de Fleury. In 1740 he began work on a collection of anatomical prints for which he had a solid list of subscribers. When he died in 1741 in Paris he left a 4½ year-old daughter, Margueritte, as sole heir. A detailed description of Le Blon's work was published in 1756 by Antoine Gautier de Montdorge who befriended him during his final years in Paris.

Le Blon's method required experience in deconstructing a colored image into its presumed primary chromatic components and understanding the effects of superimposing printing inks in certain areas, for which extensive trial and error work was required. Le Blon's process was practiced in France after his death and progressed in the early-mid-19th century into chromolithography. What was required, however, is a methodology to break images objectively into color components which became possible with the invention of color photography in the second half of the 19th century and the invention of half-tone printing in the late 19th century.

Notes

References
 Jacob Christof Le Blon on Artnet
 O. M. Lilien (1985). Jacob Christoph Le Blon, 1667-1741: Inventor of three- and four colour printing. Stuttgart: Hiersemann.
 S. Lowengard (2006). “Jacob Christoph Le Blon’s system of three-color printing and weaving” in The Creation of Color in the 18th century Europe, New York: Columbia University Press.  http://www.gutenberg-e.org/lowengard/C_Chap14.html.
 B. Van Overbeek (1708). Reliquiae antiquae urbis Romae, 3 vols. Amsterdam: Crellino.
 J. C. Le Blon (1707). Generaale proportie voor de onderscheidene lengte der beelden, Amsterdam.
  J. C. Le Blon (ca.1725). Coloritto, or the harmony of colouring in painting: reduced to mechanical practice (with parallel French text), London.
 Images of strike-offs of the plates of the portrait of Cardinal de Fleury can be viewed in R. G. Kuehni and A. Schwarz, Color Ordered (2008), New York: Oxford University Press, Chapter 9 Technical color systems.
  Antoine Gautier de Montdorge (1756) L’art d’imprimer les tableaux. Traité d’apres les écrits, les opérations et les instructions verbales de J.-C. Le Blon, Paris: Mercier.

External links
 
Le Blon's (1768) L'art d'imprimer les tableaux - digital facsimile from the Linda Hall Library
Le Blon's (1916) Coloritto (Dutch and English) - digital facsimile from the Linda Hall Library

German Baroque painters
1667 births
1741 deaths
German printers
German printmakers
German engravers
Pupils of Carlo Maratta
Freemasons of the Premier Grand Lodge of England
Color engravers